Sténio Joseph Vincent (February 22, 1874 – September 3, 1959) was President of Haiti from November 18, 1930 to May 15, 1941.

Biography
Sténio Vincent was born in Port-au-Prince, Haiti. His parents were Benjamin Vincent and Iramène Brea, who belonged to the mulatto elite.

Presidency
In October 1930, while still under occupation by the United States, Haitians elected representatives to the national assembly for the first time since 1918. It elected Vincent as President of Haiti. He had graduated from law school at age 18 before ascending to head of Haiti's Chamber of Deputies by 1915. He ran a nationalist campaign for the presidency based on his fierce opposition to the United States occupation of Haiti.

From 1915 to 1934 Haiti was occupied by U.S. Marines; the United States had intervened after the murder of a president. In August 1934 U.S. President Franklin D. Roosevelt withdrew the Marines; however, the United States maintained direct fiscal control until 1941 and indirect control over Haiti until 1947.

In 1935, Vincent conducted a plebiscite about extending his term in office, receiving a favorable vote to extend it to 1941. The plebiscite also approved an amendment to the constitution so that future presidents would be elected by popular vote.

In 1936, the Haitian Communist Party was disbanded by Vincent.

In October 1937 troops and police from the Dominican Republic massacred thousands of Haitian labourers living near the border in the Parsley Massacre. Vincent had enjoyed a cooperative relationship with and financial support from the government of Dominican President Rafael Trujillo. After two years of relative quiet in Port-au-Prince, Vincent's failure to press for justice for the slain workers prompted protests in the capital. United States president Franklin D. Roosevelt  took the case to the Dominican government, which agreed in 1938 to compensate the slain workers’ relatives the following year.

In 1941, Vincent declared his intention to step down. The presidency was peacefully transitioned to his successor, Élie Lescot.

References 

 Smith, Matthew J. Red & Black in Haiti: Radicalism, Conflict, and Political Change, 1934–1957. Chapel Hill: University of North Carolina Press, 2009.

Presidents of Haiti
1874 births
1959 deaths
Government ministers of Haiti
Members of the Chamber of Deputies (Haiti)
Haitian people of Mulatto descent
People from Port-au-Prince
1930s in Haiti
1940s in Haiti
20th-century Haitian politicians